Jerrold Viacrucis Tarog (born May 30, 1977) is a Filipino film director, screenwriter, producer, editor, and composer. He is best known for directing Heneral Luna (2015), Bliss (2017), Goyo: The Boy General (2018), and the upcoming film Darna. His first feature film was the independently-produced Confessional (2007), followed by Mangatyanan (2009) and Sana Dati (2013). He directed segments for the Shake, Rattle & Roll horror series.

Early life and education
Jerrold Tarog was born in Manila on May 30, 1977, and grew up in Canlubang, Laguna. He is the only child of Jose, an Overseas Filipino Worker from Bicol, and Aurora, who hails from Leyte. Tarog learned to play the drum at age six, and the piano at age seven.

Tarog graduated from the University of the Philippines Rural High School in Los Baños, Laguna for his primary education, and spent two years in the University of the Philippines Los Baños studying agribusiness management for his secondary education. After flunking all subjects in the agribusiness course, he changed his major and transferred to the University of the Philippines Diliman, where he was a scholar and graduated from the university's College of Music school with a degree in music composition. He briefly attended the International Academy of Film and Television in Cebu City.

Career
While a student at the UP Diliman, Tarog developed an interest in filmmaking and began taking film classes at the UP Film Center, which is located near the College of Music building. He recalled watching classic films that were directed by Akira Kurosawa, Martin Scorsese and Woody Allen. After graduation, Tarog played the drums for a heavy metal band.

In his early filmmaking career, Tarog assumed different names on separate occasions. As a screenwriter he was Ramon Ukit, a Filipinized name of his favorite American fiction writer Raymond Carver. As an editor he was Pats R. Ranyo, an anagram of the character he played in his own film Confessional, Ryan Pastor. As a sound designer he was Roger "TJ" Ladro, an anagram of his complete name. He has called his filmmaking expertise "self-taught".

2000s
In 2002, he landed a job as a musical director of the film Agimat starring Bong Revilla Jr. Subsequently, he worked for independent film director Dante Mendoza to compose the score in his films Masahista (2005), Manoro (2006), Tirador and Foster Child (both in 2007). His score for Masahista earned him a Young Critics Circle award for Best Achievement in Aural Orchestration in 2005.

In 2006 Tarog began his directorial debut in a short film entitled Carpool, which he also wrote and edited. The following year he directed his first feature film, Confessional, a political thriller mockumentary shot in Cebu City; he starred in it assuming the name David Barril. The film was the first installment in what Tarog has dubbed the Camera trilogy, explaining: "It's three films wherein the protagonist in each movie has a camera, and it's about the contrast of life and truth in front of the camera and behind it. The stories of the movies are different from each other, they're not related, and they just have common plot elements." It garnered a total of five awards at the 24th Star Awards for Movies, two of which were given to TarogDigital Movie Director (shared with co-director Ruel Antipuesto) and Digital Original Movie Screenplay. In 2009 he directed the drama film Mangatyanan (also known as The Blood Trail), starring Irma Adlawan, and was the second installment in the Camera trilogy. The film was an entry to the 2009 Cinemalaya Philippine Independent Film Festival where it won the Best Production Design award.

2010s

In 2010, Tarog directed Senior Year, a coming-of-age romantic drama film which tells the story of ten high school students during their final year in a private school in Manila. The film was partly inspired by Tarog's experience as a music student at the UP Diliman. The same year he was tapped by Regal Entertainment to direct a segment in Shake, Rattle and Roll 12, the twelfth installment in the Shake, Rattle & Roll horror anthology franchise, which marked Tarog's transition to mainstream Philippine cinema; his segment is entitled "Punerarya".

In 2011, Tarog directed Aswang, a remake of Peque Gallaga's 1992 horror film of the same name, which stars Lovi Poe, Paulo Avelino, and Albie Casiño among others. The same year he directed another segment in the Shake, Rattle and Roll franchise in its thirteenth sequel Shake, Rattle & Roll 13, entitled "Parola". The following year he served as composer in the fourteenth installment Shake, Rattle and Roll Fourteen: The Invasion, and returned to direct a segment in the fifteenth installment Shake, Rattle & Roll XV entitled "Ulam" the following year. In 2013, Tarog collaborated the second time with Lovi Poe in Sana Dati (also known as If Only), in which Poe starred opposite Paulo Avelino, who have also previously worked together in Aswang. The romantic drama film (the last installment in the Camera trilogy) was an entry to the 2013 Cinemalaya Film Festival where it garnered seven awards during the festival's Awards Night, of which Tarog won Best Director.

In 2015 Tarog co-wrote, directed, edited and scored  Heneral Luna, a historical biographical film which chronicled the leadership of General Antonio Luna of the Philippine Revolutionary Army during the Philippine–American War. The film was a commercial success in the Philippines, having earned  nationwide (about three times its production costs). The film garnered praise for its cinematography, writing, acting and plot, as well as critical acclaim from Filipino professional critics and historians alike. It has since been regarded as the most expensive Philippine historical epic film ever made. The Philippine edition of Esquire considered Heneral Luna as Tarog's breakthrough film due to its successful run.

In 2017, Tarog wrote, directed, edited and scored Bliss, a psychological thriller film starring Iza Calzado. Tarog pitched the idea for the film right after Heneral Lunas Philippine commercial release and was accepted. It took him roughly three to four months to write the screenplay, and three weeks to score it. The film competed in Japan at the 12th Osaka Asian Film Festival from March 3 to 12, 2017, and received critical acclaim during its run. Calzado received the festival's Yakushi Pearl Award for Best Performer.

Prospective films
In December 2016, Tarog announced that he and screenwriter Jade Castro had been developing a screenplay for an adaptation of  Arnold Arre's The Mythology Class, to which he said that "hopefully [it] materializes". Plans for an adaptation of the graphic novel was first made by Tarog in October 2015 after a successful pitch meeting to the producers of Heneral Luna, and Castro was already onboard as co-writer. He has envisioned the film as being divided into two cinematic parts. Tarog has praised The Mythology Class, saying it "remains potent and exhilarating" since its first publication in 1999, as well as complimenting Arre as someone whose "imagination and creativity soar to dizzying heights." Owing to its success, he hired Arre and his wife to design the poster for his film Senior Year.

In October 2018, Tarog was announced to replace Erik Matti as the director of Star Cinema's film adaptation of Darna, which is based on the eponymous comic-book superheroine created by Mars Ravelo. The film began principal photography on January 19, 2020.

Personal life
Tarog has cited Se7en, Taxi Driver, The Silence of the Lambs, and Bullets over Broadway as some of his favorite films, and The Wire, Breaking Bad, and Freaks and Geeks as his favorite television shows. He credited Filipino films Crying Ladies and Tanging Yaman as influences in filmmaking, although he had admitted not being a patron of Filipino films as a college student. Tarog is a fan of film scores composed by Alfred Hitchcock's frequent collaborator Bernard Hermann.

Tarog is nonreligious, but has said that he does "trust evidence, reason and the broadening of knowledge". In regards to his civil status, he has said he is much more "overjoyed" staying single.

Filmography

Awards and nominations

See also
Cinema of the Philippines

Notes

References

External links

1977 births
Living people
Filipino film directors
Filipino film editors
Filipino film score composers
University of the Philippines Diliman alumni
University of the Philippines Los Baños alumni
People from Laguna (province)